Daniel Gerroll (born 16 October 1951) is an English theatre, television and film actor.

Life and career
Gerroll was born in London, the son of Kathleen Cordelia (née Norman), a fashion model, and Harry Gerroll, a clothing designer. Gerroll has appeared on television in both the United Kingdom and the United States, although his greater contribution has been to the stage in both countries. In New York City, he has won the Theatre World Award for The Slab Boys and Knuckle, the Outer Critics Circle Award for Translations and the Village Voice's Obie Award for Sustained Excellence of Performance. His Broadway credits include Plenty, The Homecoming, Enchanted April, High Society, and Misery.

Gerroll's television credits include Miami Vice, Burn Notice, Cheers, Knots Landing, Seinfeld, Blue Bloods, Sex and the City, Law & Order and The Starter Wife.

On film Gerroll has appeared in Chariots of Fire, Sir Henry at Rawlinson End, 84 Charing Cross Road, Drop Dead Fred and Big Business. He played Bronson Alcott in scenes from the writer's life in the documentary profile "Louisa May Alcott: The Woman Behind 'Little Women'" that aired on the PBS series America Masters.

A relationship with the Guthrie Theatre in Minneapolis began with his playing Henry Higgins in Pygmalion in 2004. It continued with his creating the role of Scrooge in the Guthrie's updating of the annual tradition and most recently playing Benedick in Much Ado About Nothing.

Upon the death of his mother on 23 April 2006, Gerroll discovered he was the biological son of German building tycoon Heinrich Mendelssohn. He has been married to actress Patricia Kalember since 1986 and has three children, Becca (born 1985), Ben (born 1989) and Toby (born 1996).

Filmography

Television

References

External links

1951 births
Living people
English male film actors
English male television actors
Obie Award recipients
English people of German descent